The China National Democratic Construction Association (CNDCA), sometimes translated as the China Democratic National Construction Association (CDNCA), also known by its Chinese abbreviation Minjian, is one of the eight legally recognized minor political parties in the People's Republic of China under the control of the Chinese Communist Party. The CDNCA is a member of the Chinese People's Political Consultative Conference.

History 
CNDCA was founded in Chongqing in 1945 by the Vocational Education Society, a former member of the China Democratic League.

Its vice chairperson Rong Yiren served as the third vice president of China under the 4th Constitution of the People's Republic of China from 1993 to 1998.

Composition 
Members are chiefly entrepreneurs from the building, manufacturing, construction, financial, or commercial industries in both private and state sectors, and others in the field of economics. The current chairman of CDNCA is Hao Mingjin.

Chairpersons 
 Huang Yanpei (1945–1965) 
 Hu Juewen (1979–1987) 
 Sun Qimeng (1987–1996)
 Cheng Siwei (1996–2007)
 Chen Changzhi (2007–2017)
 Hao Mingjin (2017–present)

References

External links 
 

 
1945 establishments in China
Organizations associated with the Chinese Communist Party
Political parties established in 1945
Socialist parties in China